People of the Book or Ahl al-kitāb is an Islamic term referring to those religions which Muslims regard as having been guided by previous revelations, generally in the form of a scripture. In the Quran they are identified as the Jews, the Christians, the Sabians, and—according to some interpretations—the Zoroastrians. Starting from the 8th century, some Muslims also recognized other religious groups such as the Samaritans, and even Buddhists, Hindus, and Jains, as People of the Book.

The Quran uses the term in a variety of contexts, from religious polemics to passages emphasizing the community of faith among those who possess monotheistic scriptures.

In Islamic law, Muslim men are permitted to marry women who are People of the Book; however, Muslim women are prevented from marrying men who are People of the Book. In the case of a Muslim-Christian marriage, which is to be contracted only after permission from the Christian party, Christian women should not be prevented from attending church for prayer and worship. 

The term 'People of the Book' has been reappropriated as a means of self-identification by Jews and by the members of certain Christian denominations.

In the Quran

Meaning of the term 
When used in conjunction with a person, the term  identifies the members of that person's household, including their fellow tribesmen, relatives and all those who share a family background with them.

The word , meaning 'writing' or 'book', occurs very often in the Quran, generally in the sense of a divine rather than a human activity, which consists in writing down and recording everything that is created. More than just referring to a 'book', it conveys meanings of divine knowledge, divine authority, and divine revelation.

The term , then, refers to those who have been given access to such knowledge and revelation: they are the people to whom God has 'sent down' (see ) his wisdom by means of a prophet, as an act of divine grace. However, the revelations given to the People of the Book, taking the form of the Torah, the Psalms, and the Gospel, were all partial, and it is precisely by already being familiar with the books previously sent down that the People of the Book were expected to be able to recognize Muhammad as a prophet, and the Quran as the final and most complete revelation.

Identity 

Several verses in the Quran are commonly understood as identifying the Jews, the Christians, and the Sabians as People of the Book. Thus for example  5:68–69, which mentions these groups along with the Muslims ("the believers") as being safe from fear and grief:

 2:62 is similar to this, but there is also a verse ( 22:17) which lists the same groups in another context, that of how God will judge them on the Day of Resurrection, but now adding two more groups to the list:

The last named group, "the polytheists" (the), are the opposite of the first named, "the believers" (the Muslims). What is less clear, however, is the status of the groups mentioned in between, who now also include the "Magi", that is to say, the Zoroastrians (who are named only once in the Quran, in this verse). This was a matter of dispute among medieval Muslim scholars, who questioned whether the Zoroastrians had a clear prophet and scripture, as well as whether their doctrines on the nature of God and creation were in accordance with those of Islam and the other religions recognized as having received a revelation. Ultimately though, most Islamic jurists granted the Zoroastrians partial status as a People of the Book, while still disagreeing on the extent to which legal privileges such as intermarriage with Muslims should be allowed.

Usage 

The Quran emphasizes the community of faith between possessors of monotheistic scriptures, and occasionally pays tribute to the religious and moral virtues of communities that have received earlier revelations, calling on Muhammad to ask them for information. More often, reflecting the refusal of Jews and Christians in Muhammad's environment to accept his message, the Quran stresses their inability to comprehend the message they possess but do not put into practice and to appreciate that Muhammad's teaching fulfills that message. The People of the Book are also referenced in the jizya verse (Q9:29), which has received varied interpretations.

The Quran permits marriage between Muslim men and women who are People of the Book (Jews and Christians).

History

Muhammad's era (610–632) 

The Ashtiname of Muhammad, a treaty purportedly made between the Muslims of Muhammad and the Christians of Saint Catherine's Monastery, stated that if a Muslim man wished to marry a Christian woman, marriage could only occur with her consent and she must be permitted to continue attending church to pray and worship. The Ashtiname states that Christians cannot be forced to fight in wars and that Muslims should fight on their behalf; it also states that Christian churches are to be respected and forbids stealing from them. The Ashtiname forbids Muslims to remove Christians from their jobs, including those who serve as judges or monks. Muslims are bound until the Last Judgment to adhere to the treaty or "he would spoil God's covenant and disobey His Prophet." The policy of the Ottoman Sultans abided by the Ashtiname.

Rashidun Caliphate (634–661) 
During the second caliph Umar's reign, the Christian community of Najran and the Jewish community of Khaybar were deported to the newly conquered regions of Syria and Iraq. Umar set aside the Christian ban on the Jews and allowed them to pray and reside in Jerusalem. Umar signed a pact with the Christians of Jerusalem, which granted them safety in the region. He also awarded the status of the People of the Book to the Zoroastrians, although some practices contrary to Islam were prohibited.

Consequently, the Muslim authorities afforded them the status of People of the Book. However, this account is likely apocryphal, and if it took place at all, it must have occurred after the founding of Baghdad in 762. The earliest source to unambiguously apply the term 'Sabian' to the Mandaeans was al-Hasan ibn Bahlul citing the Abbasid vizier Abu Ali Muhammad ibn Muqla (–940). However, it is not clear whether the Mandaeans of this period already identified themselves as Sabians or whether the claim originated with Ibn Muqla.

Later Islamic usage
When the Umayyad general Muhammad ibn Qasim (–715) conquered Brahmanabad, he is said to have granted Hindus, Buddhists, and Jains the status of People of the Book.

Islamic scholars differ on whether Hindus are People of the Book. The Islamic conquest of India necessitated the definition be revised, as most India's inhabitants were followers of the Indian religions. Many of the Muslim clergy of India considered Hindus as people of the book, and from Muhammad bin Qasim in the Umayyad era to the Mughal ruler Aurangzeb in the 17th century, Muslim rulers were willing to consider Hindus as People of the Book.

Dhimmi

Dhimmi is a historical term referring to the status accorded to People of the Book living in an Islamic state. The word literally means "protected person." According to scholars, dhimmis had their rights fully protected in their communities, but as citizens in the Islamic state, had certain restrictions, and it was obligatory for them to pay the jizya tax, which complemented the zakat, or alms, paid by the Muslim subjects. Dhimmis were excluded from specific duties assigned to Muslims, and did not enjoy certain political rights reserved for Muslims, but were otherwise equal under the laws of property, contract, and obligation.

Under sharia, the dhimmi communities were usually subjected to their own special laws, rather than some of the laws which were applicable only to the Muslim community. For example, the Jewish community in Medina was allowed to have its own Halakhic courts, and the Ottoman millet system allowed its various dhimmi communities to rule themselves under separate legal courts. These courts did not cover cases that involved religious groups outside of their own community, or capital offences. Dhimmi communities were also allowed to engage in certain practices that were usually forbidden for the Muslim community, such as the consumption of alcohol and pork.

Historically, dhimmi status was originally applied to Jews, Christians, and Sabians. This status later also came to be applied to Zoroastrians, Hindus, Jains and Buddhists. Moderate Muslims generally reject the dhimma system as inappropriate for the age of nation-states and democracies.

Usage by Jews and Christians
In Judaism, the term "People of the Book" (Hebrew: עם הספר, Am HaSefer) has been reappropriated as a term to designate the Jewish people, in reference to the Torah or to the entire Hebrew Bible. Members of some Christian denominations have also embraced the term "People of the Book" in reference to themselves, foremost among them the Puritans as well as the Seventh-day Adventist Church and the Baptists.

See also
Abrahamic religions
Al-Bayyina
Christianity and Islam
Divisions of the world in Islam
Islam and Judaism
Islam and other religions
Islamic schools and branches
Pact of Umar

References

Sources

Further reading
 Boekhoff-van der Voort, Nicolet, "Ahl al-Kitab (People of the Book)", in Muhammad in History, Thought, and Culture: An Encyclopedia of the Prophet of God (2 vols.), Edited by C. Fitzpatrick and A. Walker, Santa Barbara, ABC-CLIO, 2014, Vol I, pp. 9–11.

External links

The Books of the People of the Book at the US Library of Congress, Hebraic Collections

Islamic terminology
Islam and Judaism
Islam and other religions
Christianity and Islam
Christian–Islamic–Jewish interfaith dialogue